Tiburonia is a genus of jellyfish in the family Ulmaridae. It was reported in 2003, following the discovery of its only species yet identified, Tiburonia granrojo. It was discovered by a crew from MBARI led by George Matsumoto. Pieces of the medusae (bell margin and arms) were collected for morphological analysis, which eventually led to sequencing and taxonomic identification. The discovery of this organism led to not only a new species, but a new subfamily of Ulmaridae, called Tiburoniinae. Its genus was named Tiburonia after the ROV the crew were using, called Tiburon, meaning "shark" in Spanish. Because of this ROVs distinct maneuverability, all angles of the organisms were able to be observed, which is particularly important to the study of gelatinous pelagic invertebrates. Its species name was originally to be called "big ugly", but Kirsten Matsumoto, George Matsumoto's Wife, raised objections to this name, and renamed it granrojo, meaning "big red" in Spanish. Giving it the name Big Red Jellyfish.

Tiburonia granrojo is one of the largest sea jellies and unusual in a number of ways. It is very likely that these jellies are exhibiting deep-sea gigantism. The radial canals of the Tiburonia granrojo do not narrow. This fact, along with the length of the arms and the shape of the bell, separates Tiburoniiae from other genera of Ulmaridae. All specimens that have been observed live in temperatures between  2.7–4.9C , salinities between 34.1–34.5 PSU, and oxygen contents between 0.15–1.22 ml of O2 1^-1. The entire jellyfish is deep red in color.

To date, only 23 members of the species have been found and only one—a small specimen under —has been retrieved for further study. Several high resolution videos of granrojo have been taken by remote controlled submarines. The discovery was announced by Dr. Matsumoto and colleagues in Marine Biology in 2003. The first specimen of the species was obtained around the Japan trench and was placed in the National Science Museum in Tokyo.

References

Further reading

External links 
 Article in the California Academic of Sciences' Science Now (Several high quality images)
 Article for National Geographic Today
 Report in Innovations Report
 Release in MBARI News
 Big Red Jellyfish | Smithsonian Ocean Portal

Ulmaridae
Scyphozoan genera
Monotypic cnidarian genera
Cnidarians of the Pacific Ocean
Marine fauna of Asia
Marine fauna of North America
Marine fauna of the Gulf of California
Western North American coastal fauna
Fauna of California
Animals described in 2003